Ecclesiastes 8 is the eighth chapter of the Book of Ecclesiastes in the Hebrew Bible or the Old Testament of the Christian Bible. The book contains philosophical speeches by a character called '(the) Qoheleth' ("the Teacher"), composed probably between the 5th and 2nd centuries BCE. Peshitta, Targum, and Talmud attribute the authorship of the book to King Solomon. This chapter concerns human and divine authority with the advice that fearing God is the wisest course.

Text
The original text was written in Hebrew. This chapter is divided into 17 verses.

Textual witnesses
Some early manuscripts containing the text of this chapter in Hebrew are of the Masoretic Text, which includes Codex Leningradensis (1008).

There is also a translation into Koine Greek known as the Septuagint, made in the last few centuries BCE. Extant ancient manuscripts of the Septuagint version include Codex Vaticanus (B; B; 4th century), Codex Sinaiticus (S; BHK: S; 4th century), and Codex Alexandrinus (A; A; 5th century). The Greek text is probably derived from the work of Aquila of Sinope or his followers.

Structure
The New King James Version has two sections within this chapter:
  = Obey Authorities for God's Sake
  = Death Comes to All

Royal authority (8:1–9)
Verse 1 closes the theme from chapter 7. and may be read as part of that section, leaving verses 2-9 as a group dealing with authority. Qoheleth then uses the previous observation of human authority to form a basis for understanding the divine authority but Weeks notes that verses 2 and 3 present "several difficulties", and their sentence division is unclear.

Verse 1
Who is like the wise?
And who knows the interpretation of a thing?
A man's wisdom makes his face shine,
and the hardness of his face is changed.
"Make his face shine": in Hebrew Bible this idiom is used of God (cf. ).
"Hardness" (KJV: "boldness"; NKJV: "sternness"): literally, "strength".

Fearing God is the wisest course (8:10–17)
Echoing the idea in Ecclesiastes 3:16–17, Qoheleth affirms that it is still 'safer to stand in fear before God', even as the righteous are sometimes regarded as wicked and the punishment of the wicked seems lacking.

Verse 15
So I commended enjoyment, because a man has nothing better under the sun than to eat, drink, and be merry; for this will remain with him in his labor all the days of his life which God gives him under the sun.
"To eat, drink, and be merry" refers to Ecclesiastes 2:23-24; 3:13; 5:18-20; 9:7, as the remedy that Qoheleth offers, that is, to accept God's gift and place oneself in his hands.

See also
 Related Bible parts: Numbers 6

Notes

References

Sources

External links

 Jewish translations:
 Kohelet – Ecclesiastes - Chapter 8 (Judaica Press) translation [with Rashi's commentary] at Chabad.org
 Christian translations:
 Online Bible at GospelHall.org (ESV, KJV, Darby, American Standard Version, Bible in Basic English)
 Ecclesiastes Chapter 8 King James Version
  Various versions

08